Diluvia is the second studio album by the American indie pop group Freelance Whales. The album was released on October 9, 2012, via Mom + Pop Music.

Track listing
All songs by Freelance Whales.

Musicians
Judah Dadone - lead vocals, banjo, guitar, synthesizer, piano, organ, bass
Chuck Criss - banjo, bass, guitar, glockenspiel, harmonium, piano, organ, synthesizer, harmonies
Kevin Read - guitar, piano, organ, synthesizer, glockenspiel, banjo, mandolin, harmonies
Doris Cellar - bass, harmonium, glockenspiel, synthesizer, harmonies, lead vocal on "Spitting Image"
Jacob Hyman - drums, percussion, harmonies

References

2012 albums
Freelance Whales albums
Mom + Pop Music albums
Frenchkiss Records albums